Paul Adam Engelmayer (born April 12, 1961) is a United States district judge of the United States District Court for the Southern District of New York.

Early life and education 

Born in New York City, New York, Engelmayer earned an Artium Baccalaureus summa cum laude in 1983 from Harvard College, where he was editorial chairman of The Harvard Crimson and inducted into Phi Beta Kappa, and a Juris Doctor magna cum laude in 1987 from Harvard Law School, where he was treasurer of the Harvard Law Review. He then worked as a clerk for United States Court of Appeals for the District of Columbia Circuit Judge Patricia Wald from 1987 until 1988, and then for Supreme Court of the United States Justice Thurgood Marshall from 1988 until 1989.

Professional career 

Between 1983 and 1984, Engelmayer worked as a staff reporter for The Wall Street Journal in the paper's Philadelphia bureau. From 1989 until 1994, Engelmayer worked as a federal prosecutor in Manhattan, serving as an Assistant United States Attorney from 1989 until 1994 but also serving as deputy chief appellate attorney in 1994. From 1994 until 1996, Engelmayer was an Assistant to the United States Solicitor General Drew S. Days, III. Engelmayer returned to the United States Attorney's office in Manhattan in 1996, serving as the chief of the major crimes unit from 1996 until 2000. In 2000, Engelmayer joined the law firm Wilmer Cutler Pickering Hale and Dorr in Manhattan as a partner. He was the partner in charge of the New York office since 2005.

Federal judicial service 

On February 2, 2011, President Obama nominated Engelmayer to a judicial seat to fill the seat vacated by Judge Gerard E. Lynch, who was elevated to the United States Court of Appeals for the Second Circuit. On March 16, 2011, Engelmayer had a hearing before the Senate Judiciary Committee. On March 31, 2011, Senator Charles Grassley placed Engelmayer's nomination on hold, along with two other nominations. Grassley later lifted the holds, and the Senate Judiciary Committee referred Engelmayer's nomination to the full Senate on April 7, 2011. On Friday, July 22, 2011, it was announced that the Senate had scheduled a full vote on Engelmayer's nomination on July 25, 2011. On July 25, 2011, the vote was postponed until July 26, 2011. The Senate confirmed Engelmayer by a 98–0 vote on July 26, 2011. He received his commission on July 27, 2011. He was the judge in the racketeering case of Daniel Hernandez, better known as American rapper 6ix9ine. He sentenced 6ix9ine to 24 months in prison with time served and five years of supervised release.

Personal 

Engelmayer and his wife, Emily Mandelstam, who are both Jewish, live in Manhattan. Englemayer and Mandelstam have two children, Caroline and William.

See also 
 List of Jewish American jurists
 List of law clerks of the Supreme Court of the United States (Seat 10)

References

External links

1961 births
Living people
20th-century American Jews
Assistant United States Attorneys
Harvard Law School alumni
Judges of the United States District Court for the Southern District of New York
Law clerks of the Supreme Court of the United States
Lawyers from New York City
The Wall Street Journal people
United States district court judges appointed by Barack Obama
21st-century American judges
Harvard College alumni
The Harvard Crimson people
Wilmer Cutler Pickering Hale and Dorr partners
21st-century American Jews